South Murwillumbah is a locality located in north-eastern New South Wales, Australia, in the Tweed Shire.

Demographics

The median age of the South Murwillumbah population was 41 years, 4 years above the national median of 37.

87.8% of people living in South Murwillumbah were born in Australia. The other top responses for country of birth were England 2.2%, New Zealand 1.7%, Scotland 0.7%, India 0.6%, Fiji 0.3%.

92.5% of people spoke only English at home; the next most common languages were 0.3% Punjabi, 0.3% French, 0.3% Hebrew, 0.3% Italian, 0.3% Mandarin.

Heritage listings 
Murwillumbah has a number of heritage-listed sites, including:

 Casino-Murwillumbah railway: Murwillumbah railway station

References 

Tweed Shire
South Murwillumbah, New South Wales